Miramont Castle is a museum located in Manitou Springs, Colorado. The Castle was originally built in 1895 as a private home for Father Jean Baptist Francolon, a French-born Catholic priest. Located in the Manitou Springs Historic District, it is a National Register of Historic Places listing.

History
Father Jean Baptiste Francolon built Miramont Castle in 1895. The house is "an eclectic estate that blends a variety of architectural styles from Byzantine to Tudor." Construction was completed in 1896.  The castle is an architectural example of the Victorian Era. In 1976 Miramont Castle was added to the National Register of Historic Places due to its significant historic heritage and architectural variety.

Sisters of Mercy operated Montcalm Sanitarium at Miramont, sharing the property with Francolon.

Popular folklore has it that the castle is haunted with various apparitions and unexplained phenomenon as reported by visitors and staff.

Current
The house is now a Victorian-era historic house museum that is owned and operated by the Manitou Springs Historical Society.  Visitors can tour 42 furnished rooms and gardens. The site also features a tea room and gift shop.

Notes

References

External links
Miramont Castle - official site

Buildings and structures on the National Register of Historic Places in Colorado
Castles in Colorado
Colorado State Register of Historic Properties
Historic house museums in Colorado
Museums in El Paso County, Colorado
Manitou Springs, Colorado
Houses completed in 1895
National Register of Historic Places in El Paso County, Colorado